Hum Dono is a 1985 Indian Hindi-language film, starring Rajesh Khanna, Hema Malini, Reena Roy in lead roles, along with Johnny Walker, Premnath, Om Shivpuri in supporting roles and is directed by B. S. Glaad. The music is by R. D. Burman, lyrics by Anand Bakshi and the songs are sung by Kishore Kumar, Asha Bhosle and Anuradha Paudwal. The movie ran silver jubilee at many centers. The most popular song from the film on its release was "Sunle Zameen Aasmaan". The film was a remake of the Telugu film Sommokadidi Sokokadidi and in Kannada as 1998 "Gadibidi Krishna"

Plot
Raja discovers that his face is similar to that of Dr. Shekhar, one of the top earning doctors of Bombay. He somehow manages to take his place, but discovers that even Dr. Shekhar has problems of his own. Dr. Shekar also discovers that he has a lookalike and goes to find him at his home and when he visits Raja's home Dr. Shekar falls in love with a girl. Shekhar and Raja are revealed to be identical twins who were separated at birth. Some goons kidnap Shekhar for money, but the brothers defeat the goons and are reunited.

Cast
Rajesh Khanna as Raja / Dr. Shekhar (double role)
Hema Malini as Lata
Reena Roy as Rani
Johnny Walker as Micheal
Premnath as Lata's Father
Iftekhar as Seth Mathura Das
Om Shivpuri as Blackbird "Boss"

Music

References

External links

1980s romantic comedy-drama films
1980s action comedy-drama films
Indian romantic comedy-drama films
Indian action comedy-drama films
1985 films
1980s Hindi-language films
Films scored by R. D. Burman
Hindi remakes of Telugu films